Oštarije   is a village in the municipality Josipdol in Karlovac County, Croatia. It is connected by the D42 highway.

Sights
Marmont Bridge

External links

Populated places in Karlovac County